The Chelyabinsk State Academic Opera and Ballet Theatre or Glinka State Academic Opera and Ballet Theatre, named after Mikhail Glinka, is an opera and ballet theatre on one of the main squares of Chelyabinsk, Russia. The capacity of the hall is 894 seats. It is the largest theatre in the Chelyabinsk Region.

History
The theatre was designed by architect N. Kurennoy and built in 1936–55 on the site of the former Nativity Cathedral, which existed from 1748 to 1932. The theatre was originally planned to open on November 7, 1941, but the Great Patriotic War led to significant delays.  The opening of the theatre eventually took place on September 29, 1956, with a production of Alexander Borodin's "Prince Igor".

Principal conductors
1955-1968 - Isidor Zak
1980-1985 - Nariman Chunikhin
1987-1991 - Viktor Sobolev
1994-2007 - Sergey Ferulev
2007-2013 - Anton Grishanin
2013 - present — Evgeny Volynsky

References

Buildings and structures in Chelyabinsk Oblast
Chelyabinsk
Theatres in Russia
Buildings and structures completed in 1955
1956 establishments in Russia